Ghora Ras Ghona railway station is part of the Kolkata Suburban Railway system and operated by Eastern Railway. It is located on the Barasat–Hasnabad line in North 24 Parganas district in the Indian state of West Bengal.

Layout

See also

References

External links 

 Ghora Ras Ghona Station Map

Sealdah railway division
Railway stations in North 24 Parganas district
Kolkata Suburban Railway stations